Viktorovka is a rural locality (a village) in Alexeyevsky Selsoviet, Blagovarsky District, Bashkortostan, Russia. The population was 190 as of 2010. There is 1 street.

Geography 
Viktorovka is located 35 km north of Yazykovo (the district's administrative centre) by road. Kugul is the nearest rural locality.

References 

Rural localities in Blagovarsky District